Breteuil may refer to:

Places in France

Breteuil, Eure, in the Eure département; alternative name Breteuil-sur-Iton
Siege of Breteuil in 1346 during the Hundred Years' War
Breteuil, Oise, in the Oise département; alternative name Breteuil-sur-Noye
 , Oise
 Château de Breteuil, southwest of Paris, in the Yvelines département

People

Baron de Breteuil
Emilie de Breteuil, marquise du Chatelet
 Henri Le Tonnelier de Breteuil (1848-1916), French aristocrat and politician